University Academy 92 (UA92) is a higher education institution  in Old Trafford, Greater Manchester, England.

History
UA92 was announced in September 2017 and offers “broader courses than traditional degrees, designed to enhance life skills as well as employability”. Degrees have a focus on personal and character development, and the skills needed for the workplace.

UA92 was co-founded by Lancaster University and members of the Class of '92, the Manchester United football players who won the 1992 FA Youth Cup, including Gary Neville, Ryan Giggs, Paul Scholes, Phil Neville and Nicky Butt. Following their successful careers after football, the players wanted to open a university which would attract students who "otherwise might not go on to higher education".

UA92 has been described by The Times as “a venture setting out to help disadvantaged young people in Manchester get a better education, with a new university that explicitly draws on the strategies and mindset of elite sport".

It opened in September 2019 in Old Trafford, Manchester.

UA92 works in partnership with industry to develop a curriculum inspired by business needs. Current partners include Microsoft, Trafford College, KPMG, Manchester United and Lancashire County Cricket Club.

In January 2021, UA92 was accepted into the Office for Students register of higher education institutions following an inspection by the Quality Assurance Agency for Higher Education (QAA).

In December 2021, it was awarded £2m funding by the Office for Students to develop a new digital academy on campus. UA92 said “the new academy will increase UA92’s student capacity for digital students almost tenfold – from 65 to 634”.

Initiatives 
In 2021, UA92 launched its 'Make It For Real' campaign to support disadvantaged students. Students eligible for the grant will each receive a Microsoft Surface Pro laptop and unlimited TalkTalk data for three years, Co-op lunch vouchers (five days a week, 52 weeks of the year for the length of their course), £150 Dunelm home vouchers and free travel to get to UA92. To qualify for the package, students needed to currently be in receipt of free school meals in their last year at school or college.

The campaign was inspired by fellow Manchester United player Marcus Rashford’s campaign for free school lunches in primary schools across the UK.

In November 2021, Wes Streeting MP, the Shadow Child Poverty Secretary, visited the campus to discuss the initiative and best practice in levelling up across education. He said the package, worth £5,000, was “a shining example of positive action to help young people from disadvantaged backgrounds access higher education”.

Disputes
In August 2017, the approval by the Department of Education to allow UA92 the use of 'University Academy 92' was questioned with critics claiming the decision to approve the use of the name makes it 'too easy' for new providers to use ‘university’ in a new institution's name.

In July 2018, it was revealed that UA92 had filed a lawsuit against Brendan Flood, who founded the University Campus of Football Business (UCFB). The lawsuit claimed trademark infringement after Flood incorporated a series of companies and trademarks using the name UA92 soon after the announcement of University Academy 92, and sought at injunction to stop Flood using the name.

The campus
Although local opinion on the project was divided as it reached the planning application stage, plans for the development of UA92 were approved by Trafford Council in a vote in January 2018. In August 2018 the campus plans were approved by Trafford Council. Work commenced in October 2018 on converting the former Kellogg's building into UA92's campus.

The main campus totals 100,000 sq ft. UA92 took up space in the building on a phased basis initially occupying the ground and first floors, totalling circa 50,000 sq ft. There is also an option for the university to take the upper two floors, again totalling around 50,000 sq ft, in subsequent academic years.

The campus was officially launched on 20 September 2019 on Brian Statham Way, Old Trafford, Mancheste and the first hundred students started in October 2019. It will eventually cater for up to 6,500 students.

Gary Neville described the project as 'potentially the biggest thing we've ever done'.

Academic profile

Degree programmes
UA92 launched on 20 September 2019 with six undergraduate degrees for September 2019 entry - accounting and finance, business studies, journalism, media and communications, physical education and sports science. Further courses launched in 2020, including Computer Science and Sports Management, with a further four courses launching in September 2022: Event Management, Sports Coaching, Sports Event Management, and Sports Media and Communications. Students apply via UCAS. Certificates in Higher Education (CertHE) are also offered.

The qualifications are built around four main specialist subject areas – business, media, sport and digital.

The curriculum – delivered in fixed morning or afternoon slots for the duration of an individual's degree – is designed to allow students from a range of educational and socio-economic backgrounds to access high quality, higher education.

UA92 works in partnership with over 30 industry partners to develop a curriculum influenced by business needs. Current partners include Microsoft, Trafford College, KPMG, TalkTalk, Manchester United and Lancashire Cricket Club.

Academic model
UA92's academic model takes place over a full academic year, worth 120 credits. Each degree is broken into modules, taught in six-week blocks, and students can join at six points in the year, rather than having to begin in September.

Assessments are contained within each block, there are no traditional end-of-year examinations.

The academic year concludes in April, enabling students to pursue paid work/placements during summer.

Personal Character Development 
Personal Character Development is a specialised programme of learning focusing on the personal skills and attributes required for life and the workplace, developing cognitive, emotional and social intelligence, an understanding of physical and mental well-being, and preparedness for employment.

Themes include: resilience, professionalism, leadership, health and well-being, team-working, financial and digital literacy, problem solving, career preparedness, reflective practice and communication skills.

This will be underpinned by support from a personal development coach, throughout study.

Staff
Sara Prowse was appointed CEO of UA92 in 2021 following a 30-year career leading and building well-known names such as Hotter Shoes, Lands End and ISME at Shop Direct, which is now known as The Very Group.

References

External links
 Official website

 
Education in Greater Manchester
Educational institutions established in 2017
2017 establishments in England
Lancaster University